Elan is a Slovenian company, located in Begunje na Gorenjskem, specializing in the production of sporting goods. It is best known for its skis and snowboards. Other products include sailboats from  length, motor yachts, apparel (mostly sportswear), and equipment for sports facilities. The brand became better known in the late 1970s, when Swedish alpine skiing ace Ingemar Stenmark won three consecutive World Cup overall titles on Elan skis. The company also manufactured license-built DG gliders from 1978.

History
The company originated from a Slovene Partisan workshop that operated during the Second World War, when skis were produced for the Yugoslavian Partisan forces. Begunje fielded the only specialized Partisan ski-unit of Yugoslavia during the war. In 1949, the company started with production of small boats, like canoes and kayaks which was later expanded into the production of FRP boats and yachts. The company has also started the production of wide range of gym equipment and sports clothing. In 1978, the production of license-built DG gliders was started. In 1991 Elan company was split into several subdivisions which continue the production. Glider production was later transferred to AMS Flight using the former Elan manufacturing facilities.

Elan SCX
Elan SCX changed the world ski industry by inventing sidecut skis, which made carve turns possible at low speeds and with a short turn radius. They were first developed in 1988 by Jurij Franko (not to be confused with the skier Jure Franko), who calculated a suitable flex pattern for the new kind of skis with his colleague Pavel Škofic. They organized a project dubbed SideCut Extreme (SCX) and set out to build prototypes. Introduced in 1993, the concept was initially ridiculed by other companies, but in secret they quickly started working on similar designs and such shaping was common by the 1995/96 model year.

Voyager
In early 2021, Elan announced that it created "the world's first fully functional, folding, all-mountain ski".

Company
The Elan Group consists of 20 interlinked companies under the joint ownership of the Skimar company. Most of the group's companies use the Elan brand-name and logo as part of their projects, products and services. The company's headquarters are located in Begunje na Gorenjskem, while its various manufacturing companies are scattered throughout Central Europe: Elan skis and sailing yachts are made in Slovenia, Elan snowboards are manufactured in Austria, and its motor yachts are produced in Croatia. The group markets its products through independent distributors in 46 countries over the world, with marketing taken over by Elan's own companies in North America, Japan, Germany, and Switzerland. On 13 March 2013 Elan's Austrian subsidiary company named „Elan Sportartikelerzeugungs- und Handelsgesellschaft m.b.H.“ located in Carinthia announced bankruptcy. Elan Austria had liabilities of 8.7 million euro and assets of 6.5 million euro. 78 employees and 120 creditors were affected by this bankruptcy.

The Slovenian state organisation SDH, which is in charge of privatisation activities in Slovenia on behalf of the government, gave its approval for the sale of the "state-owned ski maker Elan to Merrill Lynch International and Wiltan Enterprises Limited" The sale for 100% of the company including the snow sports and yachting divisions with the agreed purchase price not known.

In popular culture

In the 1985 James Bond series film A View to a Kill with Roger Moore, Russians were skiing on Elan skis.

Elan skis were clearly shown in the romantic comedy Working Girl. The character Katharine Parker (Sigourney Weaver) was skiing with RC Elan skis and poles.

See also
Elan snowboards

References

External links
 Official website
 Winter sports division
 Nautical division

Glider manufacturers
Ski equipment manufacturers
Slovenian brands
Sporting goods manufacturers of Slovenia
Manufacturing companies established in 1945
1945 establishments in Slovenia